Melanie Harrison Okoro (born 1982) is a marine estuarine and environmental scientist. She is the founder, CEO, and principal of Eco-Alpha Environmental & Engineering Services. Okoro focuses on environmental aquatic biogeochemistry, professional natural resource management, and STEM diversity initiatives. She is the first African-American women early-career scientist to serve on the Council of the American Geophysical Union (AGU).

Early life and education 
Melanie Harrison Okoro was born on November 2, 1982 in Cocoa Beach, Florida to Eugene Harrison Jr. and Sharon Harrison. Her family moved while Okoro was still a child, and she grew up in Tuskegee, Alabama. Okoro first discovered her interest in environmental science through swimming and fishing with her great-grandmother and twin sister in Lake Martin, Alabama. Okoro was a member of her high school's basketball team, and she attended Johnson C. Smith University in Charlotte, North Carolina on a basketball scholarship. Going into JCSU, Okoro intended to become a medical doctor. At JCSU, Okoro's advisor was Joseph Fail, an ecologist in the school's biology department, who she credits with guiding her to major in biology. Okoro graduated from JCSU in 2005 with her B.S in biology, and finished her education when she received her Ph.D in Marine Estuarine and Environmental Science from the University of Maryland, Baltimore County in 2011.

Career and research 
Okoro is currently the founder, CEO, and principal of Eco-Alpha Environmental & Engineering Services, an environmental and engineering consulting, staffing, and training firm located in Sacramento, California. Eco-Alpha helps solve their clients' complex environmental and engineering challenges. Before founding Eco-Alpha, Okoro worked for the National Oceanic & Atmospheric Administration (NOAA). She started at the NOAA as a graduate scientist (2009-2011), and became a Water Quality Specialist & Aquatic Invasive Species Coordinator, a position she held for 7 years in Sacramento, California. While in this position, Okoro oversaw water quality, and monitored aquatic invasive species impacts on threatened and endangered species in California, as well as in-land and coastal regions of Washington, Idaho, Oregon, Alaska, the Chesapeake Bay, Michigan, and Maryland. Okoro specializes in marine estuaries. Her areas of research and policy expertise include environmental aquatic biogeochemistry, professional natural resource management, and STEM diversity initiatives.

Awards and honors 
 2017 NOAA Fisheries Employee of the Year

Selected publications

Public engagement 
Okoro is known for her efforts in promoting diversity in STEM fields, and she has held multiple positions in several organizations related to diversity and inclusion. Okoro has served on the council of the American Geophysical Union (AGU) as an Early Career Scientist and was the Diversity & Inclusion task-force chair. Okoro was a member of the Earth Science Women's Network's Leadership Board from 2016-2018. The Earth Science Women's Network is a non-profit organization dedicated to building a resilient community that lifts all women and moves the geosciences forward. She is also a member of Minorities Striving and Pursuing Higher Degrees of Success in Earth and Space Science's (MS PHD'S) leadership board, an initiative established to facilitate preparation and advancement of underrepresented minorities (African Americans, Hispanics and Native Americans) within the Earth System Science Community. Okoro also uses social media to educate users on environmental science and issues, specifically regarding invasive species and water pollution.

References 

1982 births
Living people
African-American women scientists
People from Cocoa Beach, Florida
Johnson C. Smith Golden Bulls basketball players
University of Maryland, Baltimore County alumni
21st-century African-American scientists
21st-century African-American women
20th-century African-American people
20th-century African-American women
21st-century American scientists
21st-century American women scientists